John Morris "Moose" Baxter (July 27, 1876 – August 7, 1926) was an American Major League Baseball player. Baxter played for the St. Louis Cardinals in the  season. He played in only six games in his single season career, with four hits in 21 at-bats.

Baxter was born in Chippewa Falls, Wisconsin, and died in Portland, Oregon.

External links

Major League Baseball first basemen
St. Louis Cardinals players
Butte Miners players
Edmonton Eskimos (baseball) players
Johnstown Johnnies players
Milwaukee Brewers (minor league) players
Montgomery Senators players
New Orleans Pelicans (baseball) players
Oakland Oaks (baseball) players
Portland Browns players
Rockford Red Sox players
Scranton Miners players
Sioux City Cornhuskers players
Superior Longshoremen players
Baseball players from Wisconsin
People from Chippewa Falls, Wisconsin
1876 births
1926 deaths

References